Samarskoye (Hamar) is a rural locality (a selo) and the administrative centre of Samarsky Selsoviet, Khaybullinsky District, Bashkortostan, Russia. The population was 877 as of 2010. There are 10 streets.

Geography 
Samarskoye is located 21 km north of Akyar (the district's administrative centre) by road. Buribay is the nearest rural locality.

References 

Rural localities in Khaybullinsky District